Astrid Birnbaum is a Danish curler.

Teams

Women's

Mixed

References

External links
 

Living people
Danish female curlers
World curling champions
Danish curling champions
Year of birth missing (living people)
20th-century Danish women